Splinter (Songs from a Broken Mind) is the seventeenth solo studio album by English musician Gary Numan, released on 9 October 2013 by Mortal Records and Cooking Vinyl. The album debuted at number twenty on the UK Albums Chart on sales of 6,187 copies, becoming Numan's highest-charting album since 1983's Warriors.

Track listing

Personnel
Credits adapted from the liner notes.

 Gary Numan – vocals, keyboards
 Nathan Boddy – mixing
 Matt Colton – mastering
 Ade Fenton – keyboards, mixing, production, programming
 Robin Finck – guitar (1, 6, 9, 10)
 Doc – keyboards (1, 6, 9, 10)
 Steve Malins – art direction
 Steve Harris – guitar (1, 7, 8, 10)
 LaRoache Brothers – photography
 Tim Muddiman – guitar (2, 3, 7, 8, 11, 12); bass (2, 3, 7, 8)

Charts

Release history

References

2013 albums
Cooking Vinyl albums
Dark wave albums
Gary Numan albums